The 1948 United States presidential election in New York took place on November 2, 1948. All contemporary 48 states were part of the 1948 United States presidential election. Voters chose 47 electors to the Electoral College, which selected the president and vice president.

New York was won by local Republican Governor Thomas E. Dewey, who was running against incumbent Democratic President Harry S. Truman. Dewey ran with California Governor Earl Warren for vice president, and Truman ran with Kentucky Senator Alben W. Barkley. Dewey took 45.99% of the vote to Truman's 45.01%, a margin of 0.98%. Progressive Party candidate Henry Wallace, a former Democratic Vice President who ran to the left of Truman and was nominated by the local American Labor Party, finished a strong third, with 8.25%.

New York weighed in for this election as 1% more third-party than the national average, and less Democratic and Republican than the national average, despite New York being Governor Dewey's home state. The presidential election of 1948 was a very multi-partisan election for New York, with more than eight percent of the people who voted doing so for third parties. In typical form for the time, the highly populated urban centers of New York City, Buffalo, and Albany, voted primarily Democratic, while most of the smaller counties in New York turned out for Dewey as the Republican candidate.

Henry Wallace's relatively strong third party support as a Progressive candidate was concentrated in the New York City area; in the three Democratic boroughs of New York City (Manhattan, Brooklyn, and the Bronx), Wallace took percentages in the double digits. Wallace's vote splitting among left-leaning voters in New York City contributed to Dewey narrowly defeating Truman in the state, after New York had voted Democratic for Franklin D. Roosevelt—himself a former governor and favorite son—in the preceding four elections. Although Truman lost the state, he did pick up Oneida County, which Roosevelt had lost in all his four elections and which had last been won for the Democrats by Woodrow Wilson in the three-way 1912 election, and before that by Grover Cleveland in 1884.

Dewey won the election in New York by a narrow margin of less than one percentage point, despite it being his home state. Historical commentators have discussed how a major problem with the Dewey campaign was Dewey's almost crippling aloofness to the issues of the day. Commentators suggest any Dewey speech could be boiled down to the following: "Agriculture is important. Our rivers are full of fish. You cannot have freedom without liberty. Our future lies ahead." Many Republican voters claimed to feel difficulty identifying with the largely distant and enigmatic candidate. Truman, meanwhile, ran a very aggressive campaign, which he focused on fighting communism, furthering the social programs established under the FDR administration, and expansion of civil rights.

The election of 1948 also greatly helped to solidify the new face of the Democratic Party as oriented toward human rights as backed by the Federal Government, than to states' rights, as was previously established during the Civil War. Truman's support for civil rights, particularly those of African Americans, alienated him from many southern Democrats and added ammunition to the growth of the Dixiecrat movement in the Deep South. This caused the first cracks to show in the Democratic dominance of that region; however, the Dixiecrats were not even on the ballot outside the former Confederacy. Rather, the major third-party candidate in New York during this tumultuous election was former United States Vice President and new Progressive Party poster child Henry Wallace, who gained over eight percent of the vote in the state.

New York was the most populous state in the country at the time. For the first presidential election since 1916, New York did not back the winning candidate. This was also the first election wherein the losing major-party candidate carried their home state since Charles Evans Hughes carried New York in 1916, and the only instance between that election and 1960. Alongside Strom Thurmond’s win in South Carolina, the first time since Robert M. La Follette carried Wisconsin in 1924 that any losing candidate did so.

Truman is the last Democrat to win a presidential election without winning the Empire State, and Dewey's victory made him the third and final Republican presidential candidate to win New York without winning the election, the first being John C. Frémont in 1856 and the second Hughes in 1916. Dewey’s victory was the first of three consecutive Republican victories in the state, as New York would not vote Democratic again until John F. Kennedy won the state in 1960.

Results

Results by county

See also
 Civil rights movement
 Cold War
 Korean War
 Presidency of Harry S. Truman
 United States presidential elections in New York

Notes

References

New York
1948
1948 New York (state) elections